Kamarudin bin Md Nor is a Malaysian politician who served as member of the Malaysian United Indigenous Party (BERSATU) Supreme Leadership Council who was appointed in 2016. He is also the former Head of Information of Malaysian United Indigenous Party (BERSATU) and former Assemblyman of Semerak, Kelantan from 1997 to 1999 and from 2004 to 2008.

Kamarudin Md Nor left UMNO in 2016 and joined the BERSATU at the same year. In the 2018 Malaysian general election, he contested in the Pasir Puteh Parliamentary seat but lost to the PAS candidate.

Election results

Awards
  :
  Companion Class I of the Exalted Order of Malacca (DMSM) – Datuk (2007)

References

Living people
Former United Malays National Organisation politicians
Malaysian United Indigenous Party politicians
1957 births